Ashton is an electoral ward in Ashton in Makerfield, England. It forms part of Wigan Metropolitan Borough Council, as well as part of the parliamentary constituency of Makerfield.

Councillors 
The ward is represented by three councillors; Jenny Bullen (Lab), Danny Fletcher (Lab), and Anthony Sykes (Lab)

References

Wigan Metropolitan Borough Council Wards